The discography of Pavement, a Stockton, California-based indie rock group, consists of five studio albums, four double-length reissues, one compilation, ten extended plays, and thirteen singles. This list does not include material performed by members or former members of Pavement that was recorded with Stephen Malkmus and the Jicks, Silver Jews, Preston School of Industry, Free Kitten, The Crust Brothers, or any other associated solo or side projects.

Pavement was formed in 1989 by Stephen Malkmus (guitars, vocals) and Scott Kannberg (guitars), although Malkmus stated that at this stage they "weren't a real band". Pavement's debut, the 1989 EP Slay Tracks: 1933–1969, was recorded in a day with drummer and producer Gary Young and released on Kannberg's self-owned label Treble Kicker. The band subsequently released the EPs Demolition Plot J-7 and Perfect Sound Forever on Drag City, and in 1992 released their debut album, Slanted and Enchanted, on Matador Records. The band was joined by additional percussionist Bob Nastanovich, who assisted the increasingly erratic Young in keeping time, and later by bassist Mark Ibold. The 1992 EP Watery, Domestic was the band's first recording with their two new members, and the last with Young. Young, known for his bizarre onstage behavior with the band, was replaced by Steve West in 1993. After this, Nastanovich's role in the band expanded to also include his playing keyboards.

Pavement's first three EPs were re-released together for the 1993 compilation Westing (By Musket and Sextant). The band's next studio album release, 1994's Crooked Rain, Crooked Rain, featured the singles "Cut Your Hair" and "Gold Soundz" which nearly broke Pavement into the mainstream. The 18-song follow-up to Crooked Rain, 1995's Wowee Zowee, was more experimental than its predecessor and was initially criticized as evidence that the "defiantly anti-corporate" band was "simply afraid to succeed;" the album did not sell as well as Crooked Rain. The band's 1997 album Brighten the Corners "brought [the band] back" according to West, although shortly after the 1999 release of Terror Twilight Malkmus broke the band up. Since then, Pavement's former members have worked on various side projects, and the band's first four albums have been reissued featuring previously unreleased songs, b-sides, and compilation tracks.

Albums

Studio albums

Compilations and reissues

Live albums

EPs

Singles

Music videos

Video

Miscellaneous

References
General

 Jovanovic, Rob (2004). Perfect Sound Forever: The Story of Pavement. (Boston) Justin, Charles & Co. .
 "Pavement Discography". Matador Records. Retrieved on 18 September 2007.
 Erlewine, Stephen Thomas and Phares, Heather. "[ Pavement > Biography]". Allmusic. Retrieved on 6 October 2007.

Specific

External links
 Pavement at Matador Records
 Pavement at Drag City Records
 
 

Discographies of American artists
Rock music group discographies